Frame Switch is a small town located in Williamson County, Texas, United States. The town is roughly 30 miles northeast of Austin, Texas, and located between Hutto and Taylor. It was named after a David Frame and dates back to the late 1800s.

References

Unincorporated communities in Texas
Williamson County, Texas